ZIP Beep was a humor magazine created by J Charles (Chuck) Strinz. It was published monthly from September 1984 to 1989  and was syndicated to over 150 Bulletin Board Systems around the world through BBS Press Service, making it the first ever online humor magazine, and one of the first online magazines. Most of the original 60 monthly issues are now available on the magazine's author's website. The magazine was based in Twin Cities, Minnesota.

The humor in ZIP Beep ranged from topical articles regarding Ronald Reagan, Mickey Mouse, and Jay Leno, to more esoteric technology humor.

References

External links
 More information about ZIP Beep from its creator (Archived 2 October 2016 at the Wayback Machine.

Monthly magazines published in the United States
Satirical magazines published in the United States
Defunct magazines published in the United States
Humor magazines
Magazines established in 1984
Magazines disestablished in 1989
Magazines published in Minnesota
Online magazines published in the United States